Fridolin is a German masculine given name, derived from Old High German. Notable people with this name include:

Fridolin of Säckingen, Irish missionary, apostle of the Alamanni and founder of Säckingen Abbey
Fridolin Ambongo Besungu (born 1960), Congolese prelate of the Catholic Church
Fridolin Anderwert (1828–1880), Swiss politician
Fridolin Dietsche (1861–1908) was a German sculptor
Fridolin Friedmann (1897–1976), German-Jewish educator
Fridolin Glass (1910–1943), Austrian Nazi activist and Schutzstaffel (SS) officer
Fridolin Hamma (1881–1969), German luthier
Fridolin Heer (1834–1910), Swiss architect
Fridolin Marinus Knobel (1857–1933), Dutch diplomat and politician
Fridolin Kurmann, Swiss field hockey player
Fridolin Leiber (1853–1912), German painter
Fridolin Schley (born 1976), German writer
Fridolin von Senger und Etterlin, German Nazi general
Fridolin Sicher (1490–1546), Swiss composer and organist
Fridolin Sulser (1926–2016), Swiss-American pharmacologist
Fridolin Wagner (born 1997), German footballer
Fridolin Wenger, Swiss footballer
Fridolin Yoku (born 1997), Indonesian footballer 
Fridolin Žolna, pen name of Slovene lawyer and writer Fran Milčinski (1867–1932)

Other uses
Volkswagen Type 147 Kleinlieferwagen, informally nicknamed the Fridolin
Fridolin Arnault House, located in Wood-Ridge, Bergen County, New Jersey, United States
Gustav Fridolin (born 1983), Swedish writer, teacher and politician

German masculine given names